Logania is a genus of plants belonging to the family Loganiaceae.  Native to Australia and New Zealand, the genus includes at least 24 species including herbs, shrubs, trees and climbers.

Species include:
Logania albiflora (Andrews) Druce
Logania archeri B.J.Conn
Logania biloba B.J.Conn
Logania buxifolia F.Muell.
Logania callosa F.Muell.
Logania campanulata R.Br.
Logania centralis B.J.Conn
Logania cordifolia Hook.
Logania crassifolia R.Br.
Logania diffusa R.J.F.Hend.
Logania exilis B.J.Conn
Logania fasciculata R.Br.
Logania flaviflora F.Muell.
Logania insularis J.M.Black
Logania judithiana B.J.Conn
Logania linifolia Schltdl. - flax-leaf logania
Logania litoralis B.J.Conn
Logania micrantha Benth.
Logania minor (J.M.Black) B.J.Conn
Logania nanophylla B.J.Conn
Logania nuda F.Muell. - bare logania
Logania ovata R.Br. oval-leaf logania
Logania perryana B.J.Conn
Logania pusilla R.Br.
Logania recurva J.M.Black
Logania saxatilis G.Perry ex B.J.Conn
Logania scabrella B.J.Conn
Logania serpyllifolia R.Br.
Logania spermacocea F.Muell.
Logania stenophylla F.Muell.
Logania tortuosa D.A.Herb.
Logania vaginalis (Labill.) F.Muell.
Logania wendyae Cranfield & Keighery

References

Loganiaceae
Gentianales genera